Ataraxia/Taraxis is a 2012 extended play (EP) by American post-metal band Pelican, released through Southern Lord Records on April 10, 2012. Ataraxia/Taraxis was Pelican's final release to include founding guitarist Laurent Schroeder-Lebec.

Background and composition

In 2010, two years prior to the release of the Ataraxia/Taraxis EP, founding member and guitarist Laurent Schroeder-Lebec retired from touring with Pelican. In an official press release, it was clarified that the parting was amicable, and that he chose to focus on his family and career instead of the band. After concluding recording of Ataraxia/Taraxis, Schroeder-Lebec admitted that his "heart wasn't fully in" preparation for the next full-length album, and he removed himself from the composing process.

Pelican's goal with Ataraxia/Taraxis was to capture all major sides of the band's sound, "melodic rock, smokey doom, ambient soundscape, acoustic desert-folk, and minimalist electronics." Aaron Harris of fellow post-metal outfit Isis aided in recording percussion for the EP.

A music video for "Lathe Biosas" was released on August 20, 2013. A brief clip of the EP's first track, "Ataraxia", serves as the introduction to the video, which goes on to intersperse acted scenes with live performances.

Critical reception

Ataraxia/Taraxis was met with positive reception. The EP received an average score of 74/100 from 7 reviews on Metacritic, indicating "generally favorable reviews". Alternative Press reviewer Jason Pettigrew called the EP "ambitious" and "essential". Denise Falzon of Exclaim! wrote, "Each song on Ataraxia/Taraxis is diverse, with moments of melodious prog-rock, powerful riffs and hazy ambience; however, there's also cohesion to the EP that makes it feel expansive and utterly epic." Writing for Drowned in Sound, Michael Brown said the EP "reinstates Pelican at the top of the instrumental food chain and, if they continue like this, they show no sign of coming down." Brice Ezell of PopMatters called moments of the EP disappointing, but also wrote that as a whole, it is excellent and never boring.

Track listing

Personnel
Pelican
 Trevor de Brauw – guitar
 Bryan Herweg – bass
 Larry Herweg – drums
 Laurent Schroeder-Lebec – guitar

Additional personnel
 Aaron Harris – recording
 Aaron D.C. Edge – layout
 Collin Jordan – mastering
 Sanford Parker – mixing, recording
 Andrew Weiss – photography
 Eric Palmquist – drum assistance

Chart positions

References

Pelican (band) albums
2012 EPs
Southern Lord Records EPs